Westover may refer to:

People
 Al Westover (born 1954), American professional basketball player in Australia
 Arthur Westover (1864–1935), Canadian sport shooter and 1908 Olympian
 Charles Westover (1934–1990), better known as Del Shannon, American musician and composer
 Harry Clay Westover (1894–1983), United States federal judge
 Oscar Westover (1883–1938), United States Army major general, fourth chief of the United States Army Air Corps
 Russ Westover (1886–1966), American cartoonist
 Tara Westover (born 1986), American memoirist, essayist, and historian
 Theodorick Bland of Westover (1629–1671), Virginia politician, merchant, and planter 
 Winifred Westover (1899–1978), American film actress

Places

Localities in the United States
Westover, Alabama, a city 
Westover, Stamford, Connecticut, a neighborhood in Stamford, Connecticut
Westover, Maryland, an unincorporated community 
Westover, Missouri, an unincorporated community
Westover, New York, a hamlet in the town of Union
Westover, Pennsylvania,  a borough 
Westover, South Dakota, an unincorporated community
Westover, Arlington, Virginia, a neighborhood in Arlington, Virginia
Westover, Charles City County, Virginia, an unincorporated community
Westover, West Virginia, a city

Transportation facilities in the United States
Westover Air Reserve Base, a United States Air Force Reserve Command installation in Chicopee and Ludlow, Massachusetts, United States 
Westover Metropolitan Airport, a civilian airport in Chicopee, Granby, and Ludlow, Massachusetts, United States

In the United Kingdom
Westover, Hampshire, the ancient manor, now in Dorset, United Kingdom, over which much of modern Bournemouth has developed
Westover Down, a chalk down on the Isle of Wight, United Kingdom

Schools
Westover Christian Academy, a non-denominational Christian school in Danville, Virginia, United States 
Westover Comprehensive High School, a public high school in Albany, Georgia, United States
Westover High School (Fayetteville, North Carolina), a public high school in Fayetteville, North Carolina, United States
Westover School, an independent college-preparatory day and boarding school for girls in Middlebury, Connecticut, United States

Ships
, a United States Navy cargo ship commissioned in May 1918 and sunk in July 1918

Historic sites
Westover Church, a historic church near Charles City, Virginia, United States
Westover Manor, a historic house in Westover Hills, Texas, United States
Westover Plantation, a National Historic Landmark in Charles City County, Virginia, United States
Westover (Milledgeville, Georgia), a plantation
Westover (Eastville, Virginia), a plantation house

Other
 Westover (horse), Thoroughbred racehorse

See also
Westover-Bacon-Potts Farm
Westover and Bournemouth Rowing Club, now Bournemouth Rowing Club
Westover Gardens, Virginia
Westover Hills (disambiguation)